Kaj Svane Gnudtzmann (1 May 1880 – 22 September 1948) was a Danish gymnast who competed in the 1906 Intercalated Games.

In 1906 he won the silver medal as member of the Danish gymnastics team in the team competition.

References 
 

1880 births
1948 deaths
Danish male artistic gymnasts
Olympic gymnasts of Denmark
Olympic silver medalists for Denmark
Medalists at the 1906 Intercalated Games
Gymnasts at the 1906 Intercalated Games